Nantun is a metro station on the Green Line operated by Taichung Metro in Nantun District, Taichung, Taiwan.

Station layout

Around the station
 Taichung Mosque

References 

Taichung Metro
Railway stations in Taichung
Railway stations opened in 2020